Odyssey of the Seas is the second Quantum Ultra-class cruise ship and the last of the class operated by Royal Caribbean International. She is the 2nd newest ship out of the Royal Caribbean fleet, and primarily operates in the Caribbean out of Port Everglades.

History

Planning
On 3 November 2015, Royal Caribbean entered into an agreement with Meyer Werft for a fifth Quantum-class ship, Scheduled to be delivered in April 2021,  it was given the name, Odyssey of the Seas, on 1 February 2019.  On 12 September 2019, it was announced that Odyssey of the Seas would homeport at Port Everglades.

Construction
Construction began with the steel cutting ceremony on 1 February 2019. The kneel was laid on 3 May 2019. The coin ceremony was announced on the same day, featuring a coin being placed under the first block out of 79 total blocks of the vessel. Odyssey of the Seas floated out of Meyer Werft's shipyard on 28 November 2020. On 14 March 2021, Meyer Werft announced the start of sea trials in the North Sea, and she finished her trials on 25 March 2021.

2020 coronavirus pandemic

Due to the COVID-19 pandemic, it was announced in March 2020 that all operations would be suspended, including Odyssey of the Seas. After numerous delays, the inaugural sailing was pushed back to 3 July 2021. On 15 June 2021, it was announced that eight crew members got affected with coronavirus, leading the inaugural sailing being pushed back to 31 July 2021.

Delivery and christening 
Odyssey of the Seas was officially delivered to Royal Caribbean on 31 March 2021 in a virtual ceremony due to the COVID-19 pandemic. The inaugural sailing commenced on 31 July 2021, sailing an eight-day Southern Caribbean and Perfect Day cruise. On 13 November 2021, Bahamian Paralympic athlete Erin Brown christened the vessel in a ceremony in Port Everglades.

Description and design 
Odyssey of the Seas measures  and has a gross tonnage of 167,704, with 16 decks. The ship accommodates 4,198 passengers at double occupancy up to a maximum capacity of 5,510 passengers, as well as a 1,663 crew. There are 14 decks for guest use, 15 restaurants, 2 pools and 2,105 cabins.

Her facilities include a Wave Loch Flowrider surf simulator, a rock-climbing wall, a skydiving simulator, swimming pools, an observation pod, bumper cars, basketball court, a solarium, a Spa and Fitness Center, a theater and a casino.

Odyssey of the Seas was the first ship to include the big text for its logo on the side of the ship, representing the "bigger and bolder" Royal Caribbean.

References 

Ships built in Papenburg
Cruise ship classes
Ships of Royal Caribbean International
2020 ships